Viborg, a city in central Jutland, Denmark, is the capital of both Viborg municipality and Region Midtjylland. Viborg is also the seat of the Western High Court, the High Court for the Jutland peninsula. Viborg Municipality is the second-largest Danish municipality, covering 3.3% of the country's total land area.

History
Viborg is one of the oldest cities in Denmark, with Viking settlements dating back to the late 8th century. Its central location gave the city great strategic importance, in political and religious matters, during the Middle Ages. A motte-and-bailey-type castle was once located in the city.  Viborg's name is a combination of two Old Norse words: vé, meaning a holy place, and borg, meaning a fort, but the original name of the town was Vvibiærgh, where -biærgh means hill (modern Danish -bjerg (mountain).

Sights

Viborg is famous for Viborg Cathedral. The construction of the cathedral started in 1130 and took about 50 years. The building has burned to the ground and been re-built several times. Only the crypt of the original cathedral is still preserved. The cathedral was and is the locus of cult of Saint Kjeld of Viborg who was dean of the cathedral chapter there and had a great shrine there in the Middle Ages. The newest parts of the church are from a restoration between 1864 and 1876. The cathedral is famous for its many paintings by Danish painter Joakim Skovgaard, which depict stories from the Bible. Next to the cathedral is the Skovgaard museum, founded in 1937.

Before the Protestant Reformation Viborg was the home of five monasteries, about 12 parish churches, several chapels and of course the cathedral. The Black Friars' church dates from the 13th century. Today only the cathedral and a few remains of the Franciscan and the Dominican monasteries are left.

Sports

Since the 1990s, Viborg has had a reputation as one of Denmark's leading cities for sports. It started with handball, a popular sport in Denmark, when the women's handball team became one of best five clubs in Europe, and continued when both the men's handball team and the professional football team established themselves in their respective domestic leagues. From 1998 to 2008, Viborg FF was a member of the Danish Superliga, reaching an all-time high by winning the Danish cup in 2000.

Viborg hosts the annual Haervejsmarchen international two-day walking festival, which regularly attracts 8,000 participants, including many from outside Denmark.  It includes marked routes of distances of up to 45 kilometres a day.  The walk is affiliated to the IML Walking Association.

Education

Viborg is home to a number of educational institutions, including Viborg Katedralskole (cathedral school). Denmark's oldest educational institution celebrated its 900th birthday in 2000. The school is believed to have been founded about 1060, at the same time as the city became the seat of a bishop. The church needed to educate boys and young men to enter into the church's service, and to that purpose it created a school. Its current monumental home was built in 1926 to accommodate a larger number of students and later the school added a dormitory to house the many students from outer regions or islands not close to a gymnasium. Although this role is now basically obsolete, the dorm continues to be a popular solution for many students wanting to get away from home or for a small number of students from Greenland. Viborg Katedralskole is today one of four gymnasiums in Viborg.

Viborg is also home to The Animation Workshop, an art school based in a former army barracks on the outskirts of town. The school, which achieved official recognition from the Danish government in 2003, offers students a Bachelor of Arts in character animation.

For international parents Viborg also has an international school where all teaching is in English based on the Cambridge International examinations.

Transportation

Rail
Viborg is served by Viborg railway station. It is located on the Langå-Struer railway line and offers direct InterCity services to Copenhagen and Struer and regional train services to Aarhus and Struer.

Notable people

Public service and thinking 
 Saint Kjeld (died 1150), Archdeacon, canonized 1188
 Biskop Gunner, (Danish Wiki) (1152–1251), Bishop, co-writer of the Law of Jutland
 Knud Mikkelsen, (Danish wiki) (1421-1478/1488), Bishop, contributor to the Law of Jutland
 Niels Kaas (1535 in Stårupgård –1594) politician, Chancellor of Denmark 1573-1594 
 Vitus Bering (1617–1675) poet, historian and Supreme Court justice
 Carl Gottlob Rafn (1769–1808) enlightenment scientist and civil servant
 Sophie Zahrtmann (1841 in Vammen1925) deaconess and nurse 
 Hans Christian Cornelius Mortensen (1856–1921), ornithologist, taught in Viborg
 Bertel Dahlgaard (1887–1972) politician and statistician 
 Kåre Pugerup (born 1964) diplomat and Chief of Staff at the UN agency IFAD in Rome
 Torsten Nielsen (born 1967 in Sparkær) politician, Mayor of Viborg Municipality since 2014 
 Anders Primdahl Vistisen (born 1987 in Vridsted) DPP politician and MEP

Arts 

 Christen Aagaard (1616—1664) poet, academic and theologian
 Carl Deichman (1705–1780) Norwegian mine operator, book collector and philanthropist
 Mads Alstrup (1808–1876) first Danish portrait photographer with his own studio
 Kristian Mantzius (1819–1879) actor, popular with his audience but not his bosses
 Jeppe Aakjær (1866–1930) poet and novelist, a member of the Jutland Movement
 Anders Randolf (1870–1930) Danish American actor in American films 
 Benjamin Christensen (1879–1959), film director, screenwriter and actor 
 Tyge Hvass (1885 in  Randrup1963) a Danish functionalist architect
 A. W. Sandberg (1887–1938) a Danish film director and screenwriter 
 Jens Klok (1889–1974) a Danish architect with the Royal Danish Navy
 Gudrun Houlberg (1889–1940) actress 
 Olaf Wieghorst (1899–1988), painter of the American West
 Peter Seeberg (1925–1999), writer, worked in Viborg as a museum custodian
 Johann Otto von Spreckelsen (1929–1987), architect
 Peer Hultberg (1935–2007), a Danish author and psychoanalyst, lived in Viborg as a child
 Freddy Milton (born 1948 in Overlund) a Danish comics artist and writer
 Poul Martin Bonde (born 1958) songwriter and spokesperson of Smukfest
 Frank Hvam (born 1970) stand-up-comedian 
 Morten Lund (born 1972) jazz drummer
 Lise Rønne (born 1978) a Danish journalist and TV presenter 
 Rasmussen (born 1985) stage name of Jonas Flodager Rasmussen, Danish singer and actor

Sport 

 Charles Buchwald (1880 in Bjerringbro1951) amateur footballer, won silver medals at the 1908 and 1912 Summer Olympics
 Finn Døssing Jensen (born 1941) former footballer, 349 appearances for Viborg FF 
 Ulrik Wilbek (born 1958) successful handball coach and Mayor of Viborg since 2018
 Nicolai Vollquartz (born 1965) football referee
 Nikolaj Jacobsen (born 1971) a handball coach and former player with 148 caps for Denmark
 Steffen Højer (born 1973) former football player, 380 club caps, many for Viborg FF
 Brian Buur (born 1977) (as Brian Sorensen) a former Danish darts player
 Henrik Dalsgaard (born 1989 in Roum) footballer, over 300 club caps, plays for Brentford F.C.

In popular culture
In the science fiction book The Corridors of Time by Poul Anderson, a Danish-American writer who did considerable research on Danish history, a large part of the plot takes place in 16th-century Viborg. The protagonist - an American time traveller from the 20th century - arrives in the city in 1535 and gets involved with the adherents of the overthrown King Christian II and of the peasant rebel leader Skipper Clement, who face savage persecution in the city.

Viborg is also the setting of "Number 13", a ghost story by the English writer M.R. James.

International relations

Twin towns—sister cities
Viborg is twinned with:
 Bayeux, France

See also
 St. John's Priory, Viborg
 Chronicle of the Expulsion of the Grayfriars#Chapter 2 Concerning the Friary at Viborg
"Gymnasium" is the Danish equivalent of high school.  It is not what English speakers call a gym, or place to work out.  It offers a very rigorous education for college-bound students.

References

External links

 
Cities and towns in the Central Denmark Region
Municipal seats of Denmark
Viborg Municipality